Murk may refer to the following: 

 Murk (band), a Cuban-American house-music duo
 Murk (album), its 2004 self-titled release
 Murk (film) (Danish title: Mørke), a 2005 Danish thriller by Jannik Johansen and Anders Thomas Jensen
 Murk, a minor character in Buffy the Vampire Slayer
Murk, the German name for Mořkov, a village in Nový Jičín District, Czech Republic

People 
 George E. Murk (1894-1971), American businessman, firefighter, and politician
 Murk van Phelsum (1730–1779), Dutch physician

See also 
 "Murking", single by Jme
 Merc (disambiguation)
 Merk (disambiguation)
 Mirk, American band
 Merq, ticker symbol for Mercury Interactive